Neptune Terrace is a Home Ownership Scheme and Private Sector Participation Scheme court in Chai Wan, Hong Kong Island, Hong Kong near Greenwood Terrace and Pamela Youde Nethersole Eastern Hospital. It was jointly developed by the Hong Kong Housing Authority and New World Development and has a total of three residential blocks built in 1986.

Houses

Politics
Neptune Terrace is located in Lok Hong constituency of the Eastern District Council. It was formerly represented by Tsang Kin-shing, who was elected in the 2019 elections until July 2021.

See also

Public housing estates in Chai Wan and Siu Sai Wan

References

Chai Wan
Home Ownership Scheme
Private Sector Participation Scheme
Residential buildings completed in 1986
Housing estates with centralized LPG system in Hong Kong